Winthrop Paul "Win" Rockefeller (September 17, 1948 – July 16, 2006) was an American Republican politician and businessman who served as the 17th lieutenant governor of Arkansas from 1996 until his death in 2006. He was a member of the Rockefeller family.

Early life 
Rockefeller was born in New York City, New York, the only child of Arkansas Governor Winthrop Rockefeller and actress Jievute "Bobo" Paulekiute. His parents separated in 1950 and divorced four years later. His maternal grandparents were Lithuanian.

Rockefeller grew up in both the United States and in Europe and was educated at schools in New York, England, and in Switzerland. He graduated from Texas Christian University in Fort Worth, Texas with a degree in Ranch Management.

Political career and terms as lieutenant governor

Rockefeller served from 1981 to 1995 on the Arkansas State Police Commission. In 1991, he was appointed by President George H. W. Bush to serve on the President's Council on Rural America and became chairman of the council. He was a president of the Quapaw Area Council of the Boy Scouts of America and served on the board of directors of the national Scouting organization.

Rockefeller's first foray into elective politics came when he won a narrow victory over Arkansas State Senator Charlie Cole Chaffin, the first woman elected to serve in the Arkansas State Senate and the 1994 nominee for Lieutenant Governor. The November 1996 special election was necessitated by the resignation of Governor Jim Guy Tucker and the elevation of Lieutenant Governor Mike Huckabee to the Governorship. Rockefeller was subsequently re-elected in 1998 to a full four-year term with 67 percent of the vote, over physician Dr. Kurt Dilday. This margin far greater than the vote received by his father in the 1966 and 1968 gubernatorial elections. Rockefeller was elected once again in 2002 with 60 percent of the vote, over Arkansas State Supreme Court Justice Ron Sheffield, the first African-American nominated for statewide office as a Democrat.

As Lieutenant Governor, Rockefeller was an avid proponent of the state’s economic interests, and he often traveled at his own expense to seek out potential foreign investors, while at the same time donating his own governmental salary to charity. As Acting Governor on September 11, 2001, the day terrorists attacked the World Trade Center and The Pentagon, he resisted calls to declare a state of emergency and instead urged Arkansans to remain calm and to donate blood. He sponsored Project ChildSafe, a national firearms safety program that has distributed hundreds of thousands of free trigger locks in Arkansas. He was honorary chairman of the Arkansas Literary Festival. In 1997, Rockefeller created Books in the Attic, a program using existing resources, Boy Scouts, and volunteers to ensure access to reading opportunities for all children. In 2004, he served as the chairman of the Arkansas Republican Party.

Personal life
On March 22, 1971, Rockefeller married Deborah Cluett Sage of New York, the eldest daughter of Louis Davidson Sage and the former Constance Cluett Ward. The couple met while both were studying in Oxford, England. The wedding took place at the Bruton Parish Church at Colonial Williamsburg in Virginia.

The couple had three children:
Andrea Davidson Rockefeller (b. July 31, 1972)
Katherine Cluett Rockefeller (b. February 7, 1974)
Winthrop Paul Rockefeller Jr. (b. July 10, 1976)

The couple divorced on January 11, 1979.

On June 4, 1983, Rockefeller married Lisenne Dudderar, an administrative assistant with the Arkansas Nature Conservancy. They had four sons:
William Gordon Rockefeller
Colin Kendrick Rockefeller (born c. 1990)
John Alexander Camp Rockefeller
Louis Henry Rockefeller

They adopted a daughter, Grace, in Hong Kong. Win and Lisenne founded a school for children with learning disabilities in Little Rock, now known as the Academy at Riverdale.

Wealth
Rockefeller served as chief executive of Winrock Farms, Inc., which had been set up by his father, and had interests in various small businesses around the state: in retailing, automobiles, farming, and the resort industry. He was an active member of the National Federation of Independent Business. Rockefeller was ranked # 283 on the Forbes magazine list of the nation's wealthiest people in 2005, with a fortune the magazine estimated at $1.2 billion. As lieutenant governor, which was a part-time job, he forwarded his $34,673 state salary to charity.

Illness and death
Rockefeller had announced his candidacy for governor and was expected to face the more conservative Asa Hutchinson in the Republican primary election in May 2006. On July 20, 2005, however, he bowed out of the race due to his myeloproliferative disease, a blood disorder that can develop into leukemia if left untreated. In October 2005 and March 2006, Rockefeller underwent unsuccessful bone marrow transplants at the Fred Hutchinson Cancer Research Center in Seattle, Washington. On July 8, 2006, after the failure of his second bone marrow transplant, he returned to Little Rock, where he died eight days later at the University of Arkansas for Medical Sciences. On July 19, his body lay in state in the rotunda of the Arkansas State Capitol, and the next day, a memorial service was held at Pulaski Heights United Methodist Church, of which Rockefeller was a member. At the time of his death, he was survived by his mother, wife, children, and one granddaughter.

That fall in November, then-Attorney General Mike Beebe, the Democrat who won the race for Governor of Arkansas by defeating Hutchinson, gave tribute to the later Rockefeller saying, "Had he lived, we all know I would not have been here but rather we would have been congratulating a good friend and a great Arkansan as the next Governor, Win Paul Rockefeller."

See also
Rockefeller family
Winthrop Rockefeller

References

External links
"Arkansas Lt. Gov. Winthrop Rockefeller Dies at 57", New York Times, July 17, 2006
"Lt. Gov. Win Rockefeller Dies Peacefully", Todaysthv.com July 17, 2006.

1948 births
2006 deaths
Politicians from New York City
People from Morrilton, Arkansas
Lieutenant Governors of Arkansas
Rockefeller family
Arkansas Republican state chairmen
Arkansas Republicans
American energy industry businesspeople
Farmers from Arkansas
Ranchers from Arkansas
Businesspeople from Arkansas
Alumni of Institut Le Rosey
Texas Christian University alumni
Deaths from cancer in Arkansas
Deaths from leukemia
American people of Lithuanian descent